{{Infobox person
| name                  = Masahiko Tanaka
| native_name           = 田中 正彦
| image                 = 
| imagesize             = 
| caption               = 
| birthname             = 
| birth_date             = 
| birth_place            = Osaka, Japan
| death_date             = 
| death_place            = 
| othername             = 
| occupation            = Actor, voice actor
| yearsactive           = 1977–present
| height_cm             = 177
| known_for             = 
Attack on Titan as Dot Pixis
Initial D as Kyoichi Sudo
Pokémon 4Ever as Suicune
| website               = 
}}
 is a Japanese actor and voice actor. He is known for voicing Gauron from Full Metal Panic!, Ryo Mashiba from Hajime no Ippo, and Kyoichi Sudo from Initial D.

Filmography
TV animationInitial D (1998) (Kyoichi Sudo)The Candidate for Goddess (2000) (Headmaster)Hajime no Ippo (2000) (Ryo Mashiba)Digimon Tamers (2001) (Mihiramon)Shaman King (2001) (Ryu and Mohamed "Turbine" Tabarsi)Full Metal Panic! (2002) (Gauron)GetBackers (2002) (Fudou Takuma)Naruto (2003) (Rasa/The Fourth Kazekage)Stellvia (2003) (Carl Hutter)Monster (2004) (Dr. Boyer)Fafner in the Azure (2004) (Fumihiko Makabe)Black Lagoon (2006) (The Captain)Rin~Daughters of Mnemosyne (2008) (Tajimamori)Future Diary (2011) (Keigo Kurusu)Tiger & Bunny (2011) (Muramasa Kaburagi)Naruto Shippuden (2012) (Rasa/The Fourth Kazekage)Attack on Titan (2013) (Dot Pixis)Hajime no Ippo: Rising (2013) (Ryo Mashiba)Amagi Brilliant Park (2014) (Tetsuhige/Ironbeard)Fafner in the Azure: Exodus (2015) (Fumihiko Makabe)Drifters (2016) (Grigori Rasputin)Karakuri Circus (2018) (Shōji Saiga)Yashahime: Princess Half-Demon (2020) (Ogigayatsu Hiiragi Danjo)Shaman King (2021) (Ryunosuke Umemiya)

OVANew Story of Aura Battler Dunbine (1988) (Shott Weapon)Legend of the Galactic Heroes (1994) (Sahm)

ONAObsolete (2019) (Bowman)

MovieMobile Suit Gundam special edition (2000) (M'Quve)Initial D Third Stage (2001) (Kyoichi Sudo)Pokémon 4Ever (2001) (Suicune)Fafner in the Azure: Heaven and Earth (2010) (Fumihiko Makabe)Rainbow Fireflies (2012) (Saeko's father)

Video gamesDynasty Warriors: Gundam (2007) (M'Quve)Initial D Arcade Stage (2003–present) (Kyoichi Sudo)

Dubbing
Live-action
Alec BaldwinLooking for Richard (Clarence)Notting Hill (Jeff King)The Good Shepherd (Samuel Murach)Mission: Impossible – Rogue Nation (Alan Hunley)Paris Can Wait (Michael)Mission: Impossible – Fallout (Alan Hunley)12 Monkeys (Jose (Jon Seda))1917 (Captain Smith (Mark Strong))The Adventures of Buckaroo Banzai Across the 8th Dimension (Perfect Tommy (Lewis Smith))Against the Dark (Cross (Linden Ashby))Alpha Dog (Sonny Truelove (Bruce Willis))The Art of War (Robert Bly (Michael Biehn))Black Dog (Vince (Cyril O'Reilly))The Bone Collector (Detective Howard Cheney (Michael Rooker))Burlesque (Vincent "Vince" Scali (Peter Gallagher))The Cell (Special Agent Gordon Ramsey (Jake Weber))Chaos (Detective Quentin Conners (Jason Statham))Chernobyl (Anatoly Dyatlov (Paul Ritter))Con Air (2000 TV Asahi edition) (William "Bill Bedlam" Bedford (Nick Chinlund))Crimson Tide (Lt. Paul Hellerman (Ricky Schroder))Das Boot (2004 TV Tokyo edition) (Obersteuermann Kriechbaum (Bernd Tauber))Dead Ahead: The Exxon Valdez Disaster (Rick Steiner (David Morse))Deepwater Horizon (Jimmy Harrell (Kurt Russell))Desperado (1998 TV Asahi edition) (Navajas (Danny Trejo))Die Hard with a Vengeance (Mathias Targo (Nick Wyman), Arab Cabbie (Aasif Mandvi))Don Jon (Jon Sr. (Tony Danza))Driven to Kill (Mikhail Abramov (Igor Jijikine))Final Destination (Agent Schrek (Roger Guenveur Smith))Finding Forrester (Terrell (Busta Rhymes))The Five-Year Engagement (Winton Childs (Rhys Ifans))Flight (Charlie Anderson (Bruce Greenwood))For Love of the Game (Gus Sinski (John C. Reilly))Gossip Girl (Tim Gunn)House of Cards (Mark Usher (Campbell Scott))It Chapter Two (Alvin Marsh (Stephen Bogaert))Jacob's Ladder (Doug (Brian Tarantina))Knockin' on Heaven's Door (Martin Brest (Til Schweiger))Léon: The Professional (Norman Stansfield (Gary Oldman))Léon: The Professional (2009 Blu-Ray edition) (2nd Subordinate of Stansfield (Don Creech), Fatman (Frank Senger))Lessons of a Dream (Richard Hartung (Justus von Dohnányi))The Lost Bladesman (Cao Cao (Jiang Wen))Martha Marcy May Marlene (Patrick (John Hawkes))Michael Collins (Harry Boland (Aidan Quinn))Money Monster (Captain Marcus Powell (Giancarlo Esposito))NCIS: Los Angeles (Owen Granger (Miguel Ferrer))Pixels (Corporal Hill (Sean Bean))Police Story (Inspector Man)Predator 2 (1994 TV Asahi edition) (Captain Brent Pilgrim (Kent McCord))The Protector (Benny Garrucci (Bill Wallace))Race (Avery Brundage (Jeremy Irons))Rising Sun (Eddie Sakamura (Cary-Hiroyuki Tagawa))The Rock (Commander Charles Anderson (Michael Biehn))Rogue One (Galen Erso (Mads Mikkelsen))Safe House (2018 BS Japan edition) (Daniel Kiefer (Robert Patrick))Screamers (Marshal Richard Cooper / Private Becker Screamer (Roy Dupuis))Secondhand Lions (Stan (Nicky Katt))Seven (California (John C. McGinley))The Shawshank Redemption (Byron Hadley (Clancy Brown))Silent Trigger (O'Hara (Christopher Heyerdahl))Syriana (Stan Goff (William Hurt))The Thin Red Line (Sgt. Brian William Keck (Woody Harrelson))Twilight (Charlie Swan (Billy Burke))Underworld: Evolution (Markus Corvinus (Tony Curran))U.S. Marshals (Cosmo Renfro (Joe Pantoliano))War Horse (Major Jamie Stewart (Benedict Cumberbatch))Xanadu (Simpson (James Sloyan))

AnimationBatman: The Animated Series (Ra's al Ghul)Batman: The Brave and the Bold (Gentleman Ghost)Beware the Batman (Ra's al Ghul)A Bug's Life (Francis)How to Train Your Dragon (Stoick the Vast)How to Train Your Dragon: The Hidden World (Stoick the Vast)Monster House'' (DJ's Father)

References

External links 
 
 
 

1954 births
Living people
Japanese male video game actors
Japanese male voice actors
Male voice actors from Osaka
20th-century Japanese male actors
21st-century Japanese male actors